First National Bank Building is a historic bank building located at Creedmoor, Granville County, North Carolina.  It was built in 1912, and is a two-story, Beaux Arts style brick building.  It features raised bands of brick cross the entire first floor front elevation, exploded in sunbursts over the three round-arched openings, and an ornate metal cornice.  It housed a bank until 1977.

It was listed on the National Register of Historic Places in 1988.

References

Bank buildings on the National Register of Historic Places in North Carolina
Beaux-Arts architecture in North Carolina
Commercial buildings completed in 1912
Buildings and structures in Granville County, North Carolina
National Register of Historic Places in Granville County, North Carolina
1912 establishments in North Carolina